The Communist Party of India (CPI) is the oldest communist party in India and one of the eight national parties in the country. The CPI was founded in modern-day Kanpur (formerly known as Cawnpore) on 26 December 1925.

History

Formation
The Communist Party of India was formed on 26 December 1925 at the first Party Conference in Kanpur, which was then known as Cawnpore. Its founders included M. N. Roy, his wife Evelyn Trent, Abani Mukherji, and M. P. T. Acharya. S.V. Ghate was the first General Secretary of CPI. There were many communist groups formed by Indians with the help of foreigners in different parts of the world, Tashkent group of Contacts were made with Anushilan and Jugantar the groups in Bengal, and small communist groups were formed in Bombay (led by S.A. Dange), Madras (led by Singaravelu Chettiar), United Provinces (led by Shaukat Usmani), Punjab, Sindh (led by Ghulam Hussain) and Bengal (led by Muzaffar Ahmed).

Involvement in independence struggle
During the 1920s and the early 1930s the party was badly organised, and in practice there were several communist groups working with limited national co-ordination. The government had banned all communist activity, which made the task of building a united party very difficult. Between 1921 and 1924 there were three conspiracy trials against the communist movement; First Peshawar Conspiracy Case, Meerut Conspiracy Case and the Kanpur Bolshevik Conspiracy Case. In the first three cases, Russian-trained muhajir communists were put on trial. However, the Cawnpore trial had more political impact. On 17 March 1924, Shripad Amrit Dange, M.N. Roy, Muzaffar Ahmed, Nalini Gupta, Shaukat Usmani, Singaravelu Chettiar, Ghulam Hussain and R.C. Sharma were charged, in Cawnpore (now spelt Kanpur) Bolshevik Conspiracy case. The specific pip charge was that they as communists were seeking "to deprive the King Emperor of his sovereignty of British India, by complete separation of India from Britain by a violent revolution." Pages of newspapers daily splashed sensational communist plans and people for the first time learned, on such a large scale, about communism and its doctrines and the aims of the Communist International in India.

Singaravelu Chettiar was released on account of illness. M.N. Roy was in Germany and R.C. Sharma in French Pondichéry, and therefore could not be arrested. Ghulam Hussain confessed that he had received money from the Russians in Kabul and was pardoned. Muzaffar Ahmed, Nalini Gupta, Shaukat Usmani and Dange were sentenced for various terms of imprisonment. This case was responsible for actively introducing communism to a larger Indian audience. Dange was released from prison in 1927. Rahul Dev Pal was a prominent communist leader

On 26 December 1925 a communist conference was organised in Kanpur. Government authorities estimated that 500 persons took part in the conference. The conference was convened by a man called Satya Bhakta. At the conference Satyabhakta argued for a 'National communism' and against subordination under Comintern. Being outvoted by the other delegates, Satyabhakta left the conference venue in protest.  The conference adopted the name 'Communist Party of India'. Groups such as Labour Kisan Party of Hindustan (LKPH) dissolved into the CPI. The émigré CPI, which probably had little organic character anyway, was effectively substituted by the organisation now operating inside India.

Soon after the 1926 conference of the Workers and Peasants Party of Bengal, the underground CPI directed its members to join the provincial Workers and Peasants Parties. All open communist activities were carried out through Workers and Peasants Parties.

The sixth congress of the Communist International met in 1928. In 1927 the Kuomintang had turned on the Chinese communists, which led to a review of the policy on forming alliances with the national bourgeoisie in the colonial countries. The Colonial theses of the 6th Comintern congress called upon the Indian communists to combat the 'national-reformist leaders' and to 'unmask the national reformism of the Indian National Congress and oppose all phrases of the Swarajists, Gandhists, etc. about passive resistance'. The congress did however differentiate between the character of the Chinese Kuomintang and the Indian Swarajist Party, considering the latter as neither a reliable ally nor a direct enemy. The congress called on the Indian communists to use the contradictions between the national bourgeoisie and the British imperialists. The congress also denounced the WPP. The Tenth Plenum of the Executive Committee of the Communist International, 3 July 192919 July 1929, directed the Indian communists to break with WPP. When the communists deserted it, the WPP fell apart.

On 20 March 1929, arrests against WPP, CPI and other labour leaders were made in several parts of India, in what became known as the Meerut Conspiracy Case. The communist leadership was now put behind bars. The trial proceedings were to last for four years.

As of 1934, the main centres of activity of CPI were Bombay, Calcutta and Punjab. The party had also begun extending its activities to Madras. A group of Andhra and Tamil students, amongst them P. Sundarayya, were recruited to the CPI by Amir Hyder Khan.

The party was reorganised in 1933, after the communist leaders from the Meerut trials were released. A central committee of the party was set up. In 1934 the party was accepted as the Indian section of the Communist International.

When Indian left-wing elements formed the Congress Socialist Party in 1934, the CPI branded it as Social Fascist.

The League Against Gandhism, initially known as the Gandhi Boycott Committee, was a political organisation in Calcutta, founded by the underground Communist Party of India and others to launch militant anti-Imperialist activities. The group took the name ‘League Against Gandhism’ in 1934.

In connection with the change of policy of the Comintern toward Popular Front politics, the Indian communists changed their relation to the Indian National Congress. The communists joined the Congress Socialist Party, which worked as the left-wing of Congress. Through joining CSP, the CPI accepted the CSP demand for a Constituent Assembly, which it had denounced two years before. The CPI however analysed that the demand for a Constituent Assembly would not be a substitute for soviets.

In July 1937, clandestine meeting held at Calicut. Five persons were present at the meeting, P. Krishna Pillai, K. Damodaran, E.M.S. Namboodiripad, N. C. Sekhar and S.V. Ghate.
The first four were members of the CSP in Kerala. The CPI in Kerala was formed on 31 December 1939 with the Pinarayi Conference. 
The latter, Ghate, was a CPI Central Committee member, who had arrived from Madras. Contacts between the CSP in Kerala and the CPI had begun in 1935, when P. Sundarayya (CC member of CPI, based in Madras at the time) met with EMS and Krishna Pillai. Sundarayya and Ghate visited Kerala at several times and met with the CSP leaders there. The contacts were facilitated through the national meetings of the Congress, CSP and All India Kisan Sabha.

In 1936–1937, the co-operation between socialists and communists reached its peak. At the 2nd congress of the CSP, held in Meerut in January 1936, a thesis was adopted which declared that there was a need to build 'a united Indian Socialist Party based on Marxism-Leninism'. At the 3rd CSP congress, held in Faizpur, several communists were included into the CSP National Executive Committee.

In Kerala communists won control over CSP, and for a brief period controlled Congress there.

Two communists, E.M.S. Namboodiripad and Z.A. Ahmed, became All India joint secretaries of CSP. The CPI also had two other members inside the CSP executive.

On the occasion of the 1940 Ramgarh Congress Conference CPI released a declaration called Proletarian Path, which sought to use the weakened state of the British Empire in the time of war and gave a call for general strike, no-tax, no-rent policies and mobilising for an armed revolutionary uprising. The National Executive of the CSP assembled at Ramgarh took a decision that all communists were expelled from CSP.

In July 1942, the CPI was legalised, as a result of Britain and the Soviet Union becoming allies against Nazi Germany. Communists strengthened their control over the All India Trade Union Congress. At the same time, communists were politically cornered for their opposition to the Quit India Movement.

CPI contested the Provincial Legislative Assembly elections of 1946 of its own. It had candidates in 108 out of 1585 seats, winning in eight seats. In total the CPI vote counted 666 723, which should be seen with the backdrop that 86% of the adult population of India lacked voting rights. The party had contested three seats in Bengal, and won all of them. One CPI candidate, Somnath Lahiri, was elected to the Constituent Assembly.

The Communist Party of India opposed the partition of India and did not participate in the Independence Day celebrations of 15 August 1947 in protest of the division of the country.

After independence

During the period around and directly following Independence in 1947, the internal situation in the party was chaotic. The party shifted rapidly between left-wing and right-wing positions. In February 1948, at the 2nd Party Congress in Calcutta, B. T. Ranadive (BTR) was elected General Secretary of the party. The conference adopted the 'Programme of Democratic Revolution'. This programme included the first mention of struggle against caste injustice in a CPI document.

In several areas the party led armed struggles against a series of local monarchs that were reluctant to give up their power. Such insurgencies took place in Tripura, Telangana and Kerala. The most important rebellion took place in Telangana, against the Nizam of Hyderabad. The Communists built up a people's army and militia and controlled an area with a population of three million. The rebellion was brutally crushed and the party abandoned the policy of armed struggle. BTR was deposed and denounced as a 'left adventurist'.

In Manipur, the party became a force to reckon with through the agrarian struggles led by Jananeta Irawat Singh. Singh had joined CPI in 1946. At the 1951 congress of the party, 'People's Democracy' was substituted by 'National Democracy' as the main slogan of the party.

Communist Party was founded in Bihar in 1939. Post independence, communist party achieved success in Bihar (Bihar and Jharkhand). Communist party conducted movements for land reform, trade union movement was at its peak in Bihar in the sixties, seventies and eighties. Achievement of communists in Bihar placed the communist party in the forefront of left movement in India. Bihar produced some of the legendary leaders like Kishan leaders Sahajanand Saraswati and Karyanand Sharma, intellectual giants like Jagannath Sarkar, Yogendra Sharma and Indradeep Sinha, mass leaders like Chandrasekhar Singh and Sunil Mukherjee, Trade Union leaders like Kedar Das and others. In the Mithila region of Bihar Bhogendra Jha led the fight against the Mahants and Zamindars. He later went on the win Parliamentary elections and was MP for seven terms.

In early 1950s young communist leadership was uniting textile workers, bank employees and unorganised sector workers to ensure mass support in north India. National leaders like S A Dange, Chandra Rajeswara Rao and P K Vasudevan Nair were encouraging them and supporting the idea despite their differences on the execution. Firebrand Communist leaders like Homi F. Daji, Guru Radha Kishan, H L Parwana, Sarjoo Pandey, Darshan Singh Canadian and Avtaar Singh Malhotra were emerging between the masses and the working class in particular. This was the first leadership of communists that was very close to the masses and people consider them champions of the cause of the workers and the poor.

In 1952, CPI became the first leading opposition party in the Lok Sabha, while the Indian National Congress was in power.

In the 1952 Travancore-Cochin Legislative Assembly election, Communist Party was banned, so it couldn't take part in the election process. In the general elections in 1957, the CPI emerged as the largest opposition party. In 1957, the CPI won the state elections in Kerala. This was the first time that an opposition party won control over an Indian state. E. M. S. Namboodiripad became Chief Minister. At the 1957 international meeting of Communist parties in Moscow, the Chinese Communist Party directed criticism at the CPI for having formed a ministry in Kerala.

Liberation of Dadra-Nagar Haveli:
The Communist Party of India, along with its units in Bombay, Maharashtra and Gujarat, decided to start armed operations in the area in the July 1954. Both the areas were liberated by the beginning of August. Communist leaders like Narayan Palekar, Parulekar, Vaz, Rodriguez, Cunha and others emerged as the famous Communist leaders of this movement. Thereafter, the struggle to liberate Daman and Diu was begun by the Communist Party in Gujarat and other forces.

Goa Satyagraha:
The countrywide Goa satyagraha of 1955–56 is among the unforgettable pages in the history of freedom struggle, in which the Communists played a major and memorable role. The CPI decided to send batches of satyahrahis since the middle of 1955 to the borders of Goa and even inside. Many were killed, many more others arrested and sent to jails inside Goa and inhumanly treated. Many others were even sent to jails in Portugal and were brutally tortured.
The satyagraha was led and conducted by a joint committee known as Goa Vimochan Sahayak Samiti. S.A. Dange, Senapati Bapat, S.G. Sardesai, Nana Patil and several others were among the prominent leaders of the Samiti. Satyagraha began on 10 May 1955, and soon became a countrywide movement.

Ideological differences led to the split in the party in 1964 when two different party conferences were held, one of CPI and one of the Communist Party of India (Marxist).

During the period 1970–77, CPI was allied with the Congress party. In Kerala, they formed a government together with Congress as part of a coalition known as the United Front, with the CPI-leader C. Achutha Menon as Chief Minister. This government continued governing throughout the emergency period and was responsible for the many acts of repression throughout the period carried out against political opponents in the guise of fighting naxals, manifesting most infamously in the Rajan case. The United Front government also used this opportunity to pursue class struggle by punishing those from the managerial classes, money lenders, bosses with anti-labour stances, ration shopkeepers and truckers engaged in black marketing, under stringent provisions of MISA and DIR.

After the fall of the regime of Indira Gandhi, CPI reoriented itself towards co-operation with CPI(M).

In the 1980s, CPI opposed the Khalistan movement at Punjab. 
In 1986, CPI's leader in Punjab and MLA in the Punjabi legislature Darshan Singh Canadian was assassinated by Sikh extremists. Altogether about 200 communist leaders out of which most were Sikhs were killed by Sikh extremists in Punjab.

Present situation

CPI is recognised by the Election Commission of India as a 'National Party'. To date, CPI happens to be the only national political party from India to have contested all the general elections using the same electoral symbol. Owing to a massive defeat in 2019 Indian general election where the party saw its tally reduced to 2 MPs, the Election Commission of India has sent a letter to CPI asking for reasons why its national party status should not be revoked. If similar performance is repeated in the next election, the CPI will no longer be a national party.

On the national level they supported the Indian National Congress-led United Progressive Alliance government along with other parliamentary Left parties, but without taking part in it. Upon attaining power in May 2004, the United Progressive Alliance formulated a programme of action known as the Common Minimum Programme. The Left bases its support to the UPA on strict adherence to it. Provisions of the CMP mentioned to discontinue disinvestment, massive social sector outlays and an independent foreign policy.

On 8 July 2008, the General Secretary of CPI(M), Prakash Karat, announced that the Left was withdrawing its support over the decision by the government to go ahead with the United States-India Peaceful Atomic Energy Cooperation Act. The Left parties combination had been a staunch advocate of not proceeding with this deal citing national interests.

In West Bengal it participates in the Left Front. It also participated in the state government in Manipur. In Kerala the party is part of Left Democratic Front. In Tripura the party is a partner of the Left Front, which governed the state till 2018. In Tamil Nadu it is part of the Secular Progressive Alliance and in Bihar it is the part of Mahagathbandhan. It is involved in the Left Democratic Front in Maharashtra. In 2022 February CPI and Congress formed an alliance in Manipur named Manipur Progressive Secular Alliance. The current general secretary of CPI is D. Raja.

Presence in states
As of 2020, the CPI is a part of the state government in Kerala. Pinarayi Vijayan is Chief Minister of Kerala. CPI have 4 Cabinet Ministers in Kerala. In Tamil Nadu it is in power with SPA coalition led by M. K. Stalin. The Left Front governed West Bengal for 34 years (1977–2011) and Tripura for 25 years (1993–2018)

State Governments

List of members of parliament

List of Rajya Sabha (Upper House) members

List of Lok Sabha (Lower House) members

Leadership

The following are the members of the Central Control Commission, National Council and Candidate Members to National Council, National Executive, National Secretariat and Party Programme Commission were elected at the 23rd Party Congress of Communist Party of India held from 25 to 29 April 2018 in Kollam, Kerala.

General Secretary
D. Raja

National Secretariat

D. Raja
Atul Kumar Anjaan
Amarjeet Kaur
K. Narayana
Kanam Rajendran
Bhalchandra Kango
Pallab Sen Gupta
Binoy Viswam
Syed Azeez Pasha
Nagendra Nath Ojha
Rama Krushna Panda

National Executive

D. Raja 
Atul Kumar Anjaan
Amarjeet Kaur
K. Narayana
Kanam Rajendran
Binoy Viswam
Bhalchandra Kango
Pallab Sengupta
Nagendra Nath Ojha
Girish Sharma
Annie Raja
Azeez Pasha
Rama Krushna Panda
Manish Kunjam
P. Sandosh Kumar
K. Prekash Babu
K. Ramakrishna 
Janaki Paswan
Ram Naresh Pandey
Bhubneshwar Prasad Mehta
Munin Mahanta
A. Vanaja
R. Mutharasan
R. Venkaiah
K. Sambasiva Rao
 Chada Venkat Reddy
Gulzar Singh Goria
 T.M. Murthy
Swapan Banerjee
Bant Singh Brar
Ex-Officio Members 
Ramendra Kumar (Chairperson, Central Control Commission)

National Council members

Members from Centre:
S. Sudhakar Reddy
D. Raja
Atul Kumar Anjaan
Ramendra Kumar
Amarjeet Kaur
K. Narayana
Nagendra Nath Ojha
Bhalchandra Kango
Binoy Viswam
Pallab Sengutpa
Azeez Pasha
Annie Raja – Women Front
CH Venkatachalam – Bank Front
B.V. Vijaylakshmi – TU Front
S. V. Damle – TU Front
Vidyasagar Giri – TU Front
R.S. Yadav – Mukti Sangharsh
Manish Kunjam – Tribal Front
C. Srikumar – Defence
Gargi Chakravarthy – Women Front
Anil Rajimwale – Education Department
Viswajeet Kumar – Student Front
R. Thirumalai – Youth Front
A.A. Khan – Minority Front
 
Andhra Pradesh
 
K. Ramakrishna
M.N. Rao
J.V.S.N. Murthy
Jalli Wilson
Akkineni Vanaja

 Assam
 
Munin Mahanta
Kanak Gogoi

Bihar
 
Ram Naresh Pandey
Janki Paswan
Jabbar Alam
Rajendra Prasad Singh
Rageshri Kiran
Om Prakash Narayan
Pramod Prabhakar
Ram Chandra Singh
Nivedita

Chhattisgarh
 
R.D.C.P. Rao
Rama Sori

Delhi
 
Dhirendra K. Sharma
Prof. Dinesh Varshney

Goa
 
Christopher Fonseca

Gujarat
 
Raj Kumar Singh
Vijay Shenmare

Haryana
 
Dariyao Singh Kashyap

Himachal Pradesh
 
Shyam Singh Chauhan

Jharkhand
 
Bhubaneshwar Prasad Mehta
K.D. Singh
Rajendra Prasad Yadav
Mahendra Pathak

Jammu and Kashmir 
 
Vacant

Karnataka
 
P.V. Lokesh
Saathi Sundaresh

Kerala
 
Kanam Rajendran
K.E. Ismail
K. Prekash Babu
E. Chandrasekharan 
Adv. P. Vasantham 
T.V. Balan
C.N. Jayadevan
K.P. Rajendran
J. Chinchu Rani 
N. Anirudhan
N. Rajan

Manipur
 
Moirangthem Nara
L. Sotin Kumar

Meghalaya
 
Samudra Gupta

Maharashtra 
 
Tukaram Bhasme
Namdev Gavade
Ram Baheti
Prakash Reddy

Madhya Pradesh
 
Arvind Shrivastava
Haridwar Singh

Odisha
 
Dibakar Nayak
Ashish Kanungo
Ramakrushna Panda
Souribandhu Kar

Puducherry
 
A. M. Saleem
A. Ramamoorthy

Punjab
 
Bant Singh Brar
Jagrup Singh
Hardev Singh Arshi
Nirmal Singh Dhaliwal
Jagjit Singh Joga
 
Rajasthan
 
Narendra Acharya
Tara Singh Sidhu

Tamil Nadu
 
R. Nallakkannu
R. Mutharasan
C. Mahendran
K. Subbarayan
M. Veerapandian
T.M. Murthi
G. Palaniswamy
P. Padmavathi
P. Sethuraman

Telangana
 
Chada Venkat Reddy
Palla Venkat Reddy
K. Sambasiva Rao
Pasya Padma
K. Srinivas Reddy
K. Shanker
T. Srinivas Rao

Tripura
 
Ranjit Majumdar

Uttar Pradesh
 
Girish Sharma
Arvind Raj Swarup
Imtiyaz Ahmed
Prof. Nisha Rathor
Ram Chand Saras
Shyam Mohan Singh

Uttarakhand
 
Samar Bhandari

West Bengal
 
Swapan Banerjee 
Manju Kumar Mazumdar 
Santosh Rana
Shyama Sree Das 
Ujjawal Chaudhury 
Chittaranjan Das Thakur 
Prabir Deb 
Tarun Das
 
Candidate Members

 Rakesh Sharma
 G.M. Mizrab
 Shankar Lal
 Soman Pillai
 T.T. Jismon
 E.T. Narsimha
 Mitra Vashu
 Mahesh Rathi
 N. Chidambaram
 Shuvam Banerjee
 Sukhjinder Mahesari
 Vacant
 Vacant
 
Invitee Members
 
Bhupender Sambar
Periyaswamy 
Gulzar Singh Goria
Aruna Sinha
Asomi Gogoi
Kannagi
Usha Sahani
Indra Mani Devi
Durga Bhavani
R. C. Singh
Amiya Kumar Mohanty

Central Control Commission
Ramendra Kumar (Chairman)
 Shatrughan Prasad Singh
 Dr. Nara Singh
 P. Durga Bhavani
 Sathyan Mokeri
 Ram Baheti
 Hardev Singh Arshi
 Thrichy M. Selvaraj
 Moti Lal
 Nisha Siddhu
 Mohd. Yusuf

Party Programme Commission
Pallab Sen Gupta 
K. Prekash Babu
C.R. Bakshi
Moirangthem Nara
Anil Rajimwale

State Council Secretaries
Sources
Andhra Pradesh : K. Ramakrishna
Assam : Munin Mahanta
Bihar : Ram Naresh Pandey
Chhattisgarh : RDCP Rao
Delhi :Prof.Dinesh Varshney
Goa : RD Mangueshkar
Gujarat : Vijay Shenmare 
Haryana : Dariyao Singh Kashyap
Himachal Pradesh : Bhag Singh
Jammu & Kashmir : G. M. Mizrab
Jharkhand : Bhubneshwar Prasad Mehta
Kerala : Kanam Rajendran
Karnataka : Saathi Sundaresh
Maharashtra : Prakash Reddy
Madhya Pradesh : Arvind Shrivastava
Manipur : L. Thoiren Singh
Meghalaya : Samudra Gupta
Nagaland : M M Thromwa Konyak
Puducherry : A. M. Saleem
Punjab : Bant Singh Brar
Rajasthan : Narendra Acharya
Tamil Nadu : R. Mutharasan
Telangana : Kunamneni Sambasiva Rao
Uttar Pradesh : Girish Sharma
Uttarakhand : Jagdish Kuliyal
West Bengal : Swapan Banerjee

List of General secretaries and Chairmen of CPI
Article XXXII of the party constitution says:

"The tenure of the General Secretary and Deputy General Secretary, if any, and State Secretaries is limited to two consecutive terms—a term being of not less than two years. In exceptional cases, the unit concerned may decide by three-fourth majority through secret ballot to allow two more terms. In case such a motion is adopted that comrade also can contest in the election along with other candidates. As regards the tenure of the office-bearers at district and lower levels, the state councils will frame rules where 
necessary."

Party Congress

Principal mass organisations
All India Trade Union Congress (AITUC)
All India Students’ Federation (AISF) 
All India Youth Federation (AIYF)
National Federation of Indian Women (NFIW)
All India Kisan Sabha – AIKS (peasants organisation)
Bharatiya Khet Mazdoor Union – BKMU (agricultural workers)
Indian People's Theatre Association – IPTA (cultural wing)
All India State Government Employees Confederation (State government employees)
Indian Society for Cultural Co-operation and Friendship (ISCUF)
All India Peace and Solidarity Organisation (AIPSO)
Progressive Writers' Association (PWA)
All India Adivasi Mahasabha (Tribal Wing)
All India Dalit Rights Movement (AIDRM)
Tamil Nadu Oppressed People's Movement
People's Service Corps
Ganamukti Parishad
In Tripura, the Ganamukti Parishad is a major mass organisation amongst the Tripuri peoples of the state.

Former chief ministers

Notable leaders
Abdul Sattar Ranjoor – Founding state secretary of the CPI in Jammu and Kashmir
Ajoy Ghosh – Former general secretary of CPI, freedom fighter
Amarjeet Kaur – General Secretary of AITUC and National Secretary of CPI
Annabhau Sathe – Samyukta Maharashtra movement leader
Annie Raja – General Secretary of NFIW and National Executive Member of CPI
Ardhendu Bhushan Bardhan – Former general secretary 
Aruna Asaf Ali – Freedom fighter
Binoy Viswam – Member of Rajya Sabha, Former minister in the Government of Kerala
Bhargavi Thankappan – Parliamentarian
Bhupesh Gupta – Parliamentarian
C. Achutha Menon – Finance minister in first Kerala ministry Former chief minister of Kerala
C. Divakaran – Senior leader, former minister and National Council Member from Kerala
Chandra Rajeswara Rao – former general secretary, Telangana freedom fighter
Chaturanan Mishra parliamentarian & former Central Minister of India
Chittayam Gopakumar – Deputy Speaker of Kerala Legislative Assembly and State council member
C. K. Chandrappan – Parliamentarian & former Kerala state secretary of the party
C. N. Jayadevan – Senior leader, parliamentarian
Dhanwantri – one of the founder of communist party in Jammu & Kashmir
Darshan Singh Canadian – Trade Unionist, fight against Khalistan movement 
D. Pandian – Parliamentarian & former Tamil Nadu state secretary 
D. Raja – parliamentarian & General secretary of the party
E. Chandrasekharan Nair – Senior leader and former Minister in the Government of Kerala
Geeta Mukherjee – Parliamentarian & Former Vice President of National Federation of Indian Women 
Govind Pansare – Prominent activist and lawyer
Gurudas Dasgupta – Parliamentarian & Former General Secretary of the All India Trade Union Congress (AITUC) and Bharatiya Khet Mazdoor Union
Hajrah Begum – former general secretary of NFIW
Hasrat Mohani – founding member
Hijam Irabot – Founder leader of CPI in Manipur
Hirendranath Mukherjee-Parliamentarian & He was awarded Padma Bhushan in 1990 and Padma Vibhushan in 1991 by the President of India for his lifelong services
 Ila Mitra – Peasant Movement Leader from West Bengal
Indrajit Gupta – Parliamentarian, former general secretary and a former central minister
Jagannath Sarkar – former National Secretary, freedom fighter, builder of communist movement in Bihar and Jharkhand
Junu Das – Prominent leader of CPI
Kalpana Datta – freedom fighter
Kalyan Roy – Parliamentarian
Kanam Rajendran – Current Kerala state secretary of the party
K.N. Joglekar – founding member of CPI
Meghraj Tawar – Former Rajasthan MLA and leader of the CPI
M. Kalyanasundaram – Parliamentarian
M. N. Govindan Nair – Kerala state secretary during the first communist ministry and a freedom fighter
Mohit Banerji – Prominent Leader
Nallakannu – former Tamil Nadu state secretary of the party
N.E. Balaram – Founding leader of the communist movement in Kerala, India
Pannyan Raveendran – Former Kerala state secretary of the party
Parvathi Krishnan – Parliamentarian
P. Krishna Pillai – Founder and First secretary of CPI in Kerala
P. K. Vasudevan Nair – Former Chief minister of Kerala, Former AISF general secretary, Former AIYF general secretary
Puran Chand Joshi – first general secretary of the Communist Party of India
P. S. Sreenivasan – Former Minister of Kerala
Rajaji Mathew Thomas – Journalist, former MLA and CPI National council Member, from Kerala
Ramendra Kumar – Former Parliamentarian, national executive member, national president AITUC
Rosamma Punnoose – Freedom Fighter
R.Sugathan – Prominent trade unionist, mass leader and member of Kerala Legislative assembly
Sachchidanand Vishnu Ghate – First general secretary of CPI, freedom fighter
 Satypal Dang- He was a legislator of Punjab State Legislative Assembly, representing the Communist Party of India for four terms and a Minister of Food and Civil Supplies in the United Front ministry led by Justice Gurnam Singh and Padma Bhushan Awardee.
S.S. Mirajkar – Trade Unionist, Freedom fighter
Suhasini Chattopadhyay – founding member of CPI
Suravaram Sudhakar Reddy – former general secretary of the party & parliamentarian
Shripad Amrit Dange – Freedom fighter & former chairman of the party
Thoppil Bhasi – Writer, film director & parliamentarian
T. V. Thomas – Minister in first Kerala ministry
Veliyam Bharghavan – Parliamentarian & Former Kerala state secretary of the party
Vidya Munshi – Journalist
Vimla Dang – leader of CPI 
V. S. Sunil Kumar – Former Agriculture Minister in Kerala
V.V. Raghavan -CPI Central Secretariat Member, two-time Loksabha Member from Thrissur Kerala, Rajya sabha Member, Former Agriculture minister of Kerala

General election results

* : 12 seats in Assam and 1 in Meghalaya did not vote.

State Legislative assembly results 

N/A indicates Not Available

Results from the Election Commission of India website. Results do not deal with partitions of states (Bihar was bifurcated after the 2000 election, creating Jharkhand), defections and by-elections during the mandate period.

See also
Politics of India
List of political parties in India
List of communist parties in India
List of communist parties
Left Democratic Front (Kerala)
Left Front (West Bengal)
Left Front (Tripura)

Footnotes

Further reading
 
 Chakrabarty, Bidyut. Communism in India: Events, Processes and Ideologies (Oxford University Press, 2014). 
 Devika, J. "Egalitarian developmentalism, communist mobilization, and the question of caste in Kerala State, India." Journal of Asian Studies (2010): 799–820. online
 D'mello, Vineet Kaitan. "The United Socialist Front: The Congress Socialist Party and the Communist Party of India." Proceedings of the Indian History Congress. Vol. 73. (2012) online.
 Haithcox, John Patrick. Communism and Nationalism in India (Princeton UP, 2015).
 Kautsky, John H. Moscow and the Communist Party of India: A Study in the Postwar Evolution of International Communist Strategy. (MIT Press, 1956).
 Kohli, Atul. "Communist Reformers in West Bengal: Origins, Features, and Relations with New Delhi." in State Politics in Contemporary India (Routledge, 2019) pp. 81–102.
 Lockwood, David. The communist party of India and the Indian emergency (SAGE Publications India, 2016).
 Lovell, Julia.  Maoism: A Global History (2019)
 Masani, M.R. The Communist Party of India: A Short History. (Macmillan, 1954). online
 Overstreet, Gene D., and Marshall Windmiller. Communism in India (U of California Press, 2020)
 Paul, Santosh, ed. The Maoist Movement in India: perspectives and counterperspectives (Taylor & Francis, 2020).
 Pons, Silvio and Robert Service, eds. A Dictionary of 20th-Century Communism (Princeton UP, 2010) pp 180–182.
 Singer, Wendy. "Peasants and the Peoples of the East: Indians and the Rhetoric of the Comintern," in Tim Rees and Andrew Thorpe, International Communism and the Communist International, 1919–43. (Manchester University Press, 1998).
 Steur, Luisa. "Adivasis, Communists, and the rise of indigenism in Kerala." Dialectical Anthropology 35.1 (2011): 59–76. online
 N.E. Balaram, A Short History of the Communist Party of India. Kozikkode, Cannanore, India: Prabhath Book House, 1967.
 Samaren Roy, The Twice-Born Heretic: M.N. Roy and the Comintern. Calcutta: Firma KLM Private, 1986.

Primary sources
 G. Adhikari (ed.), Documents of the History of the Communist Party of India: Volume One, 1917–1922. New Delhi: People's Publishing House, 1971.
 G. Adhikari (ed.), Documents of the History of the Communist Party of India: Volume Two, 1923–1925. New Delhi: People's Publishing House, 1974.
 V.B. Karnick (ed.), Indian Communist Party Documents, 1930–1956. Bombay: Democratic Research Service/Institute of Public Relations, 1957.
  Rao, M. B., Ed. Documents Of The History Of The Communist Party Of India(1948–1950), Vol. 7 (1960) online

External links

 
  
  
 

 
1925 in India
1925 establishments in India
Former member parties of the United Progressive Alliance
Communist parties in India
Anti-Americanism
Anti-capitalist organizations
Left-wing parties
Left-wing parties in Asia
Left-wing politics in India
Anti-fascist organizations
Anti-imperialist organizations
National political parties in India
Political parties established in 1925
Indian independence movement
Recognised national political parties in India
International Meeting of Communist and Workers Parties